Pınarbaşı is a town (belde) and municipality in the Çelikhan District, Adıyaman Province, Turkey. The town is populated by Kurds of the Reşwan tribe and had a population of 3,193 in 2021.

The town is divided into the neighborhoods of Aktaş, Balıkburnu, Cami, Çamlıyayla, Hacılar, İnönü, Kaya and Kurudere.

The town was impacted by the 2023 Turkey–Syria earthquake on 6 February, including ten mortalities. Subsequently, an aftershock (4.2) with an epicenter located in the town hit on 11 February.

References

Towns in Turkey
Populated places in Adıyaman Province
Çelikhan District
Kurdish settlements in Adıyaman Province